Skylab is a 2021 Indian Telugu-language period comedy drama film written and directed by debutant Vishvak Khanderao. Produced by Byte Features in association with Nithya Menen Company, the film stars Nithya Menen, Satya Dev and Rahul Ramakrishna. The plot follows fictitious incidents in a Telangana village preceding the disintegration of the American space station Skylab in 1979. The film traces the fear looming among the villagers in a comical manner in light of these developments.

Skylab was released theatrically on 4 December 2021.

Plot
The film is set in 1979 amidst a remote village Bandalingampalli in Telangana. This is also the time when a US-based Skylab satellite fails and its debris is all set to fall to Earth. The information about the satellite falling is communicated to scientists working in India.

Dr. Anand and Subedar Ramarao become friends over the bus journey to Bandalingampalli. Gowri returns from Hyderabad after learning about her father's illness. Due to car's breakdown, she travels in the same bus Anand and Ramarao were traveling. On reaching the village, Gowri learns that her father was well and her mother along with the servant had sent wrong information. Being disappointed about return from the city, she decides to write and post it. Gowri's mother and Vishnu Oi decide to not tell Gowri about the newspaper dismissal. Meanwhile, Anand wants to earn Rs.5000 to re-establish his lost medical license. He decides to team with Ramarao to open the clinic which has been shut for 25 years. Ramarao's family has a lot of debts and his family is against doing menial jobs. Ramarao decides to pawn another of the family's antique jewellery to re-start the clinic. Despite the village panchayat asking him not to reopen the clinic, the duo decides to make it a big village event. Gowri starts looking into how she can get her big story for publication.

The possibility of Skylab falling in India is announced over radio and villagers begin talking about it. The clinic is opened with fanfare and this announcement is communicated. The villagers decide to close the clinic and ask Anand and Ramarao to pay a fine. Gowri meanwhile starts scaring the villagers about the real possibility of Skylab falling in the village. Immediately, the Panchayat chief falls and Anand is called for medication. He tells the villagers that the chief needs to be cared for in the clinic and all of them agree to re-opening. Over a span of 40 days, everyone begins to worry about the real possibility of Skylab crashing in the village and looking for alternate places for protection. Gowri gets an idea to write the story of life of villages from her school teacher and it gets published. Anand who wanted to leave the village after his grandfather paid the sum to get his final license decides against it. Anand and Ramarao successfully help with a childbirth and the entire village is content. Given the circumstances of the D-day, the untouchables entire the temple, the maids and servants use their owner's goods, and everyone attempts to fulfil their wishes. They eventually learn over the radio that Skylab has fallen into the Indian Ocean, and everyone is elated.

Cast 
 Nithya Menen as Gowri
 Satya Dev as Dr. Anand
 Rahul Ramakrishna as Subedar Ramarao
 Tanikella Bharani as Sadashivam, Anand's grandfather
 Vishnu Oi as Seenu
 G. V. Narayana Rao as Venkataraju, Gowri's father
 Tulasi as Padma, Gowri's mother
 Subbaraya Sharma as Sudarshan Rao, Telugu schoolmaster
 Tharun Bhascker as a scientist (Cameo)

Production 
Debutant writer-director Vishvak Khanderao wrote Skylab from the stories he heard in his village in Karimnagar district of Telangana about the crashing American space station Skylab in 1979. In an interview with The Hindu, Khanderao talked about the storyline. "The main characters are eccentric and the story not only explores what happens when the news of Skylab’s crash breaks out, but also the human psyche. The comedy is situational and in sync with the characters," he added.

Nithya Menen, Satyadev Kancharana and Rahul Ramakrishna play the principal characters of Skylab. The film also marked Menen's maiden production venture. She also spoke in Telangana dialect for the first time in the film. Skylab began its production in March 2020 but was halted after a day of shoot due to the COVID-19 pandemic and resumed later. The film was released on 4 December 2021.

Reception 
Writing for The Hindu, Sangeetha Devi Dundoo called the film "a charming tale of a peculiar village." Dundoo appreciated the performances, stating, "Nithya is credible as the aristocrat who yearns for her identity but hasn’t yet worked enough for it and Satya Dev looks every bit the opportunist who later has a change of heart and has a homecoming of sorts." Rating 3 stars of 5, Thadagadh Pathi of The Times of India wrote, "This is a rare film where there’s no such thing as a ‘lead’ because it’s the story that’s the hero of the tale. Director Vishvak Kanderao truly pours life into the character inhabiting this world, aided by heart-touching dialogues."

Appreciating the storyline and performances, The News Minute critic Balakrishna Ganeshan said, "While Skylab is largely fun, sans violence, and a well-intentioned film, some of the scenes are inorganic." In his review for Cinema Express, Ram Venkat Srikar praised the technical values of the film, writing, "Prashanth R Vihari’s lovely score wonderfully captures the varying moods without overselling the emotion. Ravi Teja Girijala’s editing finds simple yet inventive methods to exalt simple scenes and montages. Aditya Javvadi’s camera and lighting are in a duet throughout, and yet the frames never come across as flashy."

Anji Shetty of Sakshi appreciated Khanderao for picking a novel storyline but opined that he couldn't translate the humour and narration well onto the screen. A reviewer from Eenadu also felt the same, saying that the film's pacing could have been better.

References

External links 

 

2021 comedy-drama films
Indian comedy-drama films
Films set in 1979
Films set in Telangana
Films shot in Telangana
Film productions suspended due to the COVID-19 pandemic
2021 directorial debut films
Indian films based on actual events
Indian historical drama films
Skylab program
Films about outer space
Films set on spacecraft